Part Three (Part III) of the Constitution of Albania is the third of eighteen parts.
Titled The Assembly, it is divided into 4 chapters that consist of 22 articles.

The Assembly 
Chapter I: Election and Term

Chapter II: The Deputies

Chapter III: Organization and Functioning

Chapter IV: The Legislative Process

References

3